Kadyevo is a rural locality (a village) in Vyatkinskoye Rural Settlement, Sudogodsky District, Vladimir Oblast, Russia. The population was 21 as of 2010. There are 2 streets. It is located near the Klyazma River.

Geography 
Kadyevo is located 49 km northwest of Sudogda (the district's administrative centre) by road. Borisogleb is the nearest rural locality.

References 

Rural localities in Sudogodsky District